Tributyltin hydride is an organotin compound with the formula (C4H9)3SnH. It is a colorless liquid that is soluble in organic solvents.  The compound is used as a source of hydrogen atoms in organic synthesis.

Synthesis and characterization
The compound is produced by reduction of tributyltin oxide with polymethylhydrosiloxane:
 2 "[MeSi(H)O]n"  +  (Bu3Sn)2O   →   "[MeSi(OH)O]n"   +  2 Bu3SnH 
The hydride is a distillable liquid that is mildly sensitive to air, decomposing to (Bu3Sn)2O.  Its IR spectrum exhibits a strong band at 1814 cm−1 for νSn−H.

Applications

It is a specialized reagent in organic synthesis.  Combined with azobisisobutyronitrile (AIBN) or by irradiation with light, tributyltin hydride converts organic halides (and related groups) to the corresponding hydrocarbon.  This process occurs via a radical chain mechanism involving the radical Bu3Sn•. The radical abstracts a H• from another equivalent of tributyltin hydride, propagating the chain. Tributyltin hydride's utility as a H• donor can be attributed to its relatively weak bond strength (78 kcal/mol). 

It is the reagent of choice for hydrostannylation reactions:
RC2R′  +  HSnBu3  →   RC(H)=C(SnBu3)R′

See also
 Tributyltin
 Trimethylsilyl

Further reading
 Hayashi, K.; Iyoda, J.; Shiihara, I. "Reaction of organotin oxides, alkoxides and acyloxides with organosilicon hydrides. New preparative method of organotin hydrides " J. Organomet. Chem. 1967, 10, 81.

References 

Organotin compounds
Radical initiators
Metal hydrides
Tin(IV) compounds
Butyl compounds